Risen Peak is a peak 2 nautical miles (3.7 km) north of Medhovden Bluff in the Gjelsvik Mountains of Queen Maud Land. Mapped from surveys and air photos by the Norwegian Antarctic Expedition (1956–60) and named Risen (the giant).

See also
Gygra Peak

References

Mountains of Queen Maud Land
Princess Martha Coast